Richard "Dickie" Bachmann (born 1968 or 1969) is a Filipino sports executive and former basketball player who serves as the chairman of the Philippine Sports Commission (PSC).

Education
Bachmann attended De La Salle University from 1986 to 1991 graduating with a degree in commerce.

Career

Playing career
Bachmann also played for the Green Archers, the De La Salle University's varsity team when he was in college. He was also part of the Alaska Milkmen of the Philippine Basketball Association. He joined the team in the 1993 PBA Draft at age 25.

Sports administration
Bachmann was the basketball commissioner of the University Athletic Association of the Philippines (UAAP) having overseen Season 85. He was selected by host Adamson University as commissioner and was set to also oversee Season 86 prior to his appointment as PSC chairman. He is also the chairman of the Philippine Basketball Association's (PBA) 3x3 league.

He was the general manager of the defunct PBA team Alaska Aces.

Bachmann was appointed by President Bongbong Marcos as chairman of the Philippine Sports Commission (PSC) on December 28, 2022. He succeeded Noli Eala and took oath as chairman on January 4, 2023. He resigned from his other duties with the UAAP and the PBA 3x3 to fully focus on his role with the PSC.

References

 Living people
Alaska Aces (PBA) players
Filipino sports executives and administrators
De La Salle University alumni
De La Salle Green Archers basketball players
University Athletic Association of the Philippines basketball players
Chairpersons of the Philippine Sports Commission
Philippine Basketball Association executives
1960s births
Filipino men's basketball players
Filipino men's basketball coaches
Alaska Aces (PBA) coaches